Sarah Jane Woodson Early, born Sarah Jane Woodson (November 15, 1825 – August 1907), was an American educator, black nationalist, temperance activist and author. A graduate of Oberlin College, where she majored in classics, she was hired at Wilberforce University in 1858 as the first black woman college instructor, and also the first black American to teach at a historically black college or university (HBCU).

She also taught for many years in community schools.  After marrying in 1868 and moving to Tennessee with her minister husband Jordan Winston Early, she was principal of schools in four cities.  Early served as national superintendent (1888–1892) of the black division of the Women's Christian Temperance Union (WCTU), and gave more than 100 lectures across five states. She wrote a biography of her husband and his rise from slavery that is included among postwar slave narratives.

Early life and education
Sarah Jane Woodson, the fifth daughter and youngest child of eleven of Jemima (Riddle) and Thomas Woodson (1790–1879), was born free in Chillicothe, Ohio, on November 15, 1825.  Her parents had moved to the free state of Ohio in 1820 after her father purchased the whole family's freedom for $900. They left Greenbrier County, Virginia, where the Woodsons were one of only two free black families in the entire county.

They founded the first black Methodist church west of the Alleghenies. In 1830 the Woodsons were among the founders of a separate black farming community called Berlin Crossroads, since defunct. The nearly two dozen families living there by 1840 established their own school, stores and churches. Her father and some brothers became black nationalists, which influenced Sarah Woodson's activities as an adult. Additionally, Berlin Crossroads was a prominent spot on the Underground Rail Road, with the Woodson's opening their home to many runaway slaves.

Her father believed that he was the oldest son of Sally Hemings and President Thomas Jefferson; this tradition became part of the family's oral history. According to professional historians, this was not supported by known historical evidence. In 1998 DNA testing of descendants of the Jefferson, Hemings and Woodson male lines showed conclusively that there was no match between the Jefferson and Woodson lines; the Woodson male line did show western European paternal ancestry.  According to historians at Monticello, no documents support the claim that Woodson was Hemings' first child, as he appeared to have been born before any known child of hers. Professional historians have ignored the erasure of the name of a male slave, who was born in 1790, whose named was recorded in Jefferson's Farm Book by Thomas Jefferson and the survival of at least one letter of the name of the mother of the son in the Farm Book, as well. Thomas Woodson was born in 1790 and this time also matches the year of birth for the son named Tom attributed to Sally Hemings by newsman James Callender.<ref name="MontBrief">"Thomas Jefferson and Sally Hemings: A Brief Account", Plantation & Slvery, Monticello, Quote: "The DNA study found no link between the descendants of Field Jefferson [tested because Thomas Jefferson had no direct male descendants] and Thomas C. Woodson... But there is no indication in Jefferson's records of a child born to Hemings before 1795, and there are no known documents to support that Thomas Woodson was Hemings' first child.", accessed 6 March 2011. Woodson, A President in the Family, 215–17.</ref>

Woodson showed an interest in education at an early age, memorizing every hymn sung by her family at age three and lengthy passages of the Bible at the age of five. In 1839 Sarah Woodson joined the African Methodist Episcopal Church (AME), founded in 1816 as the first independent black denomination in the United States. Her brothers, Lewis, Thomas, and John were ministers in the church. The Woodson family emphasized education for all their children. Sarah Jane and her older sister Hannah both enrolled in Oberlin College in 1852. Sarah Jane completed the collegiate program, with a degree in Classical Studies, while Hannah enrolled in the preparatory program and left after about a year. Sarah graduated in 1856, among the first African-American women college graduates. Oberlin was one of the schools recommended by the African Methodist Episcopal (AME) church.

Career
After graduation, she taught in black community schools in Ohio for several years and was the first principal at a public school in Xenia, Ohio. In 1863 she gave "Address to Youth," to the Ohio Colored Teachers Association, one of a number of speeches she gave following the Emancipation Proclamation to urge African-American youth to join the "political and social revolutions."  She encouraged them to follow careers in education and the sciences to lead their race.

When hired in 1858 at Wilberforce University in Wilberforce, Woodson became the first African-American woman college instructor. While there she was appointed "Preceptress of English and Latin and Lady Principal and Matron," making her a renowned teacher of English and Latin0. She was also the first African-American to teach at a Historically Black College or University (HBCU) and the only black woman to teach at an HBCU before the Civil War. Her brother, Rev. Lewis Woodson, was a trustee and founder of the college. It had been established in 1855 to educate black youth, as a collaboration between the white and black leaders of the Cincinnati Methodist conference and the AME Church in Ohio, respectively. Wilberforce closed for two years during the Civil War because of finances. It lost most of its nearly 200 subscription students at the beginning of the war, as they were mostly mixed-race children of wealthy planters from the South, who withdrew them at that time. During the war, the Cincinnati Methodist Conference could not offer its previous level of financial support, as it was called to care for soldiers and families.

The AME Church purchased the college and reopened it in 1863; this was the first African-American owned and operated college. She also served as Lady Principal and Matron. She was later re-hired by the university in 1866 following a nearly one year closure because of the civil war.

After the Civil War, in 1868, Woodson began teaching in a new school for black girls established by the Freedmen's Bureau in Hillsboro, North Carolina. Though millions of black Southerners began to move to the North after the Civil War to escape violence in the South, Woodson was determined to educate the children of the freedmen. She was not alone, as many Oberlin alumni of both races, due to the school's commitment to anti-slavery ideology and activism, acted on similar commitments.

In 1888, Woodson Early was elected for a four-year term as national superintendent of the Colored Division of the Women’s Christian Temperance Union. In 1893, Woodson spoke at the World's Congress of Representative Women in Chicago. Her speech was entitled "The Organized Efforts of the Colored Women of the South to Improve Their Condition." Woodson was one of five African-American women invited to speak at this event, along with: Fannie Barrier Williams, Anna Julia Cooper, Hallie Quinn Brown, and Fanny Jackson Coppin.

Her career ended with her death at the age of 82 on August 15, 1907.

Marriage and family
On September 24, 1868, Woodson, then aged 42, married the Reverend Jordan Winston Early, an AME minister who had risen from slavery. Sarah and Jordan Early had no children. Jordan Early retired from active minister appointments in 1888. Sarah Early helped her husband with his ministries, and also taught community schools. In total, she taught school for nearly four decades, as she believed education was critical for the advancement of the race. She served as principal of large schools in four cities as well.

Reform activities
Sarah W. Early became increasingly active in the Women's Christian Temperance Movement, one of numerous reform activities of the nineteenth century. In 1888 she was elected for a four-year term as national superintendent of the Colored Division of the Women's Christian Temperance Union; during her tenure, Early traveled frequently and gave more than 100 speeches to groups throughout a five-state region.
Sarah W. Early became superintendent of the Colored Division within the WTCU. She was also a spokesperson for the Prohibition Party in Tennessee.

Works

Woodson's 1863 speech was collected and published by Bishop Daniel Payne, ed., The Semi-Centenary and the Retrospection of the African Methodist Episcopal Church, Baltimore: Sherwood, 1868.
Sarah J. W. Early, The Life and Labors of Rev. J. W. Early, One of the Pioneers of African Methodism in the West and South (1894), a biography of her husband. It has been classified among the post-Civil War slave narratives, as she covered Early's rise from slavery through his decades of missionary activities for the AME church.

Legacy and honors
1888, Woodson Early was appointed superintendent of the Colored Division of the Women’s Christian Temperance Union (WCTU).
1893, Woodson Early was named "Representative Woman of the Year" at the Chicago World's Fair (World's Columbian Exposition). As per Findagrave.com Sarah J. W. Early was buried at the Greenwood Cemetery, Nashville, TN.

References

Further reading

 Ellen Lawson and Marlene Merrill, The Three Sarahs: Documents of Antebellum Black College Women, Edwin Mellen Press, 1984
 Byron W. Woodson Sr., A President in the Family, Thomas Jefferson Sally Hemings and Thomas Woodson, (Westport CT, Praeger, 2001)

External links
Sarah J. W. Early, Life and Labors of Rev. Jordan W. Early, One of the Pioneers of African Methodism in the West and South, Nashville: Publishing House A.M.E. Church Sunday School Union, 1894, carried at Documenting the American South'', University of North Carolina

1825 births
1907 deaths
Oberlin College alumni
People from Greene County, Ohio
People from Chillicothe, Ohio
Wilberforce University faculty
People who wrote slave narratives
African-American educators
African-American women writers
American women writers
African-American writers
19th-century American writers
19th-century American women writers
Educators from Ohio
19th-century American women educators
19th-century American educators
20th-century African-American people
20th-century African-American women